Kimberly "Kimber" Henry Troy is a fictional character on the FX American television series Nip/Tuck, portrayed by Kelly Carlson.

Character history
Kimber is a one-time model, pornographic actress, and pornography director and producer. She is one of six series regulars, usually at the center of the show's sometimes boundary-pushing and controversial storylines. Originally a guest star in the pilot episode, Kimber was promoted to a recurring character for the show's first two seasons before finally becoming a series regular in season three, in part due to both critical and audience acclaim for actress Kelly Carlson's performance. A troubled blonde bombshell, with an anachronistic hairstyle inspired by Marilyn Monroe, Kimber was initially envisaged as a blond, "tarty" model from South Beach until Carlson instilled vulnerability into her performance, ultimately rendering Kimber empathetic.

Carlson is also responsible for some of Kimber's quirks and self-exploration, and has said she enjoys playing a character who is trying to find herself. Series creator Ryan Murphy has noted Kimber's many "incarnations" through each additional season, her constant reinvention reflective of the series itself.

In an interview with Entertainment Weekly published online a day after the airing of Kimber's suicide episode, actress Kelly Carlson confirmed Kimber's death, but promised that she reappears in visions, and as Christian's conscience.

Season one
Aspiring model Kimber meets Christian Troy at a bar. She is initially uninterested in him, before being told that he is a plastic surgeon. The two of them have wild sex, but the following morning Christian tells her that she is an "8 out of 10" and can make her a "10" by operating on her. After undergoing painful surgery and being ignored by Christian, she vandalizes both his luxurious sports car and his boat. While investigating the culprit, Christian rekindles their relationship and they begin dating. However, Kimber can't match Christian's playboy lifestyle, so Christian strikes a deal with Merrill Bobolit to push Kimber into his arms as a "trade" for Bobolit's prized Lamborghini Diablo. The trade works, but when Kimber discovers the truth she attacks Christian, tying him to his bed and slicing him with a knife. Kimber takes the car, and later becomes engaged to Bobolit. However, she breaks off their engagement when Bobolit loses his medical license and practice.

Season two
Christian reunites with Kimber when he discovers that she has been in contact with Gina Russo and will give evidence against him in the custody battle for baby Wilber. Christian initially plays on Kimber's remaining attraction to him, but is repulsed when her cocaine addiction is revealed. Christian discovers that her nasal septum has been destroyed, and he offers to fix it for free provided she keeps quiet during the deposition. Despite dreams of becoming an actress, Kimber gets involved with porn and quickly becomes a hot commodity within the industry. She later returns to McNamara/Troy requesting surgery on the vagina of a life-size sex doll modeled on her image. Kimber wants Christian to perform the surgery, but he declines. While Sean creates a mold of her vagina, Kimber explains that she may be a masochist, as she loves Christian despite the pain he puts her through. Sean tells her that she is simply too trusting, and that he admires her spirit. Kimber soon discovers that Sean has had sex with her doll, and he gets to try out the real thing when the two of them engage in a brief affair. At dinner with Sean, Kimber explains that Alma, her psychic, told her that the heart line in her hand is broken in two, hinting at a love tragedy. She wants her lines surgically connected and extended to change fate. Despite at first calling the request ridiculous, Sean is seduced into performing the procedure. Kimber's fling with Sean falls apart, and she again falls into the arms of Christian. Moving behind the camera and directing her own erotic films, Kimber tells Christian that she loves him and will always be there for him.

Season three
In an effort to help Christian get back to his old self following his sexual attack at the hands of The Carver, a serial rapist, Kimber agrees to invite bisexual detective Kit McGraw into their relationship to spice things up. However, once the Christian she knows and loves returns, she puts an end to their agreement. Christian proposes to Kimber, but tragedy strikes when Kimber is kidnapped from their wedding by The Carver. Christian assumes that Kimber left him, and he later has this confirmed via a Dear John letter penned by her (but only under order from The Carver). Several weeks later, a dazed Kimber is found wandering along a Miami highway. It is revealed that The Carver has undone all of Kimber's previous surgeries without anesthesia, as well as carving his signature smile into her face. Christian fixes her destroyed body but Kimber ends their relationship soon after, displaying signs of Stockholm syndrome and feeling sympathy for her captor and his message that "beauty is a curse on the world".

Season four
After her torture at the hands of The Carver, Kimber converts to Scientology. She runs into Matt McNamara at the gym and introduces him to the cult through an E-meter test. Matt initially explores the faith in an effort to spend time with her, but Kimber tells him that she is uninterested in having a relationship with him. Kimber enrages Julia McNamara when she encourages Matt to move out of the McNamara home due to its "toxic environment". Christian talks Kimber into taking him back and they sleep together. The following morning Christian reveals that he was simply using her for sex, which destroys Kimber. As revenge, Kimber sleeps with Matt. Weeks later, Kimber and Matt show up at McNamara/Troy and reveal that they are married and expecting a baby together. Christian believes the baby is secretly his, but DNA tests prove otherwise. Kimber and Matt move in together, and Matt films a porn movie with her in an effort to spice up their sex life. A hallucination of Xenu forces Kimber to come to terms with what she has done in the last year, while Matt confesses to Sean that he has known all along that Kimber only married him to get back at Christian but loves her anyway. Sean tells Kimber about Matt's true feelings for her, and she replies that she is trying to love him.

Season five
Kimber and Matt travel to Los Angeles with their new baby girl Jenna in tow. Matt tells Sean and Christian that he has taken Jenna and left Kimber, but this is in fact a ruse to get money to pay for his and Kimber's spiraling addiction to crystal methamphetamine. Kimber tries to return to the porn industry, but is shot down by producer Ram Peters due to her habit. After quitting drugs through Scientology, Kimber agrees to dump Matt in return for surgery on her meth-ravaged face and teeth. Kimber tells Matt that she never loved him, and moves in with Ram. They announce their plans to marry, with Ram legally adopting Jenna. Kimber's idea of a picture-perfect family turns sour, however, when Ram invites Eden Lord into their relationship, molding her into Kimber's porn protégé. Four months later, Kimber has appeared to reconcile with Matt and has given him visitation rights. After dropping off Jenna, Kimber kisses Christian but laughs and recoils at the sight of his post-surgery breast cancer scar. She tells him that his cancer is karma for the way he has treated women over the years, and is surprised that something like it didn't happen sooner. Later, Jenna is spotted by baby-model scouts who wish to represent her, but only if she has collagen injected into her "thin, villainous lips". Kimber administers the collagen incorrectly, leading Christian to do the deed and rejects Kimber's decision to get Jenna a successful modeling career. After Ram throws her out to be with Eden, Kimber takes Jenna to live with Matt while she searches for an apartment and learns of Christian. Discovering that Christian is about to marry Liz and is dying from cancer, Kimber confronts Liz and tells her that she is the one who should be with Christian in his last days. Liz rejects the idea, believing that Kimber is only after Christian's wallet. Kimber shows up at the wedding ceremony uninvited. When the priest asks if anybody disagrees with the union, Kimber stands up with tears in her eyes. However, she silently leaves the church instead of speaking out.

Season six
After studying via night classes, Kimber becomes an electrology specialist, working out of a backroom at a nail salon in downtown Los Angeles. Cash-strapped, she enters into a business venture with Christian making sex toys, using Christian's anatomy as a mould. At the same time, Kimber gets engaged to plastic surgeon Dr. Mike Hamoui, and has a caricature of his face tattooed onto her arm. Christian appeals to Kimber to leave Mike and marry him instead, but Kimber believes he is merely acting out as a result of seeing her with another man. Despite her ambivalence, Kimber pictures Christian's face while making love to Mike, ends their engagement and later asks for Christian to remove her new tattoo. Getting back together with Christian, Kimber is driven to bulimia following Christian's affair with an overweight woman and her own brief bout of binge eating, and later tells Christian that she hates herself, and that she constantly comes back to him because he "hates [her] the best". Despite claiming that Christian is only with her because he hates himself and believes that Kimber is all he deserves, she continues their relationship. Soon after, Kimber reveals to Christian that she is pregnant. Because of his own desire not to have any more children and due to his opinions on Kimber's current parenting of Jenna, Christian tells her to get an abortion or lose him. The ultimatum continues when Christian promises to marry her if she goes through with what he wants. A desperate Kimber's attempts to seduce Mike end up backfiring on her, and she later confesses that she can't raise another child on her own. Visiting an abortion clinic, Kimber turns to Liz for help, opening up about her own love for Christian and how she can't live without him. Kimber has an abortion, but complications during surgery result in her being unable to have children again. Liz tells Christian that if he ever decides to leave Kimber, her inability to have children will remind him of what she sacrificed in order to be with him.

In the second half of the sixth season, Kimber is now working as an interior decorator, overseeing the remodeling of the McNamara/Troy practice. She is also married to Christian, but suspects that he has been sleeping with another designer working on the project. Sean covers for Christian, lying to Kimber about Christian's fidelity. Later, Kimber grows disappointed with the changes in Christian's physical appearance, as well as his negative treatment of her new career. Christian gets Sean to hire Kimber to decorate his new apartment, and Sean showers her with compliments after she reveals her work. This leads to a passionate secret affair between the two of them. Any sign of personal guilt from Kimber is alleviated when she discovers Christian has been spending time with one of his patients, a supermodel. Her secret affair with Sean dampens her sex life with Christian, who at a patient's urging experiments with autoerotic asphyxiation. When nearly killing himself while performing the act, Christian has a moment of clarity in which he realizes that he can never love Kimber the way she needs to be loved and that he was meant to be alone. He kicks her out of his apartment and she, after talking with Sean, goes back to be with Mike on his boat. She tries to rekindle their relationship, but Mike isn't interested. At rock bottom, Kimber goes to the bow of the ship and jumps off. Christian learns of this 12 hours later, and though the Coast Guard is still searching for her she is presumed dead. Kimber re-appears, first berating him for sleeping with her estranged mother, and later reuniting with him on a beach while Christian is under anesthesia. Kimber tells Christian not to feel guilt for what happened to her. In his apartment, Christian tells her that he's missed her. They kiss, and Kimber (now inhabiting the body of Joan Rivers) tells Christian that nobody could have saved her, before saying goodbye to him. Kimber, back in her own body, then literally fades away. Kimber appears for the final time in another dream of Christian's, in which she tells him that she killed herself to get away from him, and that Sean too will end up the same way if Christian doesn't end their relationship. Later, Christian, in a throwback to his and Kimber's very first meeting, meets a blonde model at a bar and introduces himself as a "plastic surgeon".

References 

Nip/Tuck characters
Fictional bisexual females
Television characters introduced in 2003
Fictional methamphetamine users
Fictional models
Fictional suicides
Fictional pornographic film actors
Scientology in popular culture
American female characters in television